The 1788–89 United States House of Representatives elections were the first U.S. House of Representatives elections following the adoption of the Constitution of the United States. Each state set its own date for its congressional elections, ranging from November 24, 1788 to March 5, 1789, before or after the first session of the 1st United States Congress convened on March 4, 1789. They coincided with the election of George Washington as the first president of the United States.

With the new form of government needing to be operational prior to the completion of the first national census, ArticleI, Section 1, Clause3 of the U.S. Constitution set a temporary apportionment of seats. Among the original 13 states, 11 of them ratified the Constitution and elected 59 total representatives. North Carolina and Rhode Island did not ratify the Constitution until after the 1st Congress began, and consequently did not elect their representatives until 1790.

Actual political parties did not yet exist, but new members of Congress were informally categorized as either "pro-Administration" (i.e., pro-Washington and pro-Hamilton) or "anti-Administration".

The first session of the first House of Representatives came to order in Federal Hall, New York City on March 4, 1789, with only thirteen members present. The requisite quorum (thirty members out of fifty-nine) was not present until April 1, 1789. The first order of business was the election of a Speaker of the House. On the first ballot, Frederick Muhlenberg was elected Speaker by a majority of votes. The business of the first session was largely devoted to legislative procedure rather than policy.

Election summaries
ArticleI, Section 1, Clause3 of the U.S. Constitution set a temporary congressional apportionment until the first national census was completed in 1790. 

In the 18th and much of the 19th century, each state set its own date for elections. In many years, elections were even held after the legal start of the Congress, although typically before the start of the first session. In the elections for the 1st Congress, five states held elections in 1788, electing a total of 29 Representatives, and six held elections in 1789, electing a total of 30 Representatives. Two states, North Carolina and Rhode Island, did not ratify the Constitution until November 21, 1789 and May 29, 1790 respectively, well after the Congress had met for the first time, and, consequently, elected representatives late, in 1790, leaving North Carolina unrepresented in the 1st session and Rhode Island in the 1st and 2nd sessions of a total of 3 sessions.

House composition

Beginning of the 1st Congress

End of the 1st Congress (1791) 
Six seats were filled late because North Carolina and Rhode Island ratified the Constitution late. One pro-Administration representative resigned and the seat remained open at the end of the Congress.

Special election 
This was the first special election to the United States House of Representatives.

|-
! nowrap | 
| Benjamin West
|  | Pro-Administration
| 1788/89
|  | Member-elect (see below) chose not to serve.New member elected June 22, 1789.Pro-Administration hold.
| nowrap | 
|}

Connecticut

Delaware 

Delaware had a single representative. The election was held January 7, 1789. Under the law at the time, each voter cast two votes for representative, at least one of whom had to be from a different county.

Georgia 

Georgia had a mixed at-large/district system for the 1st Congress. Representatives were elected at-large, but for three district-based seats.

Maryland 

Maryland had a mixed district/at-large system similar to Georgia's. Under Maryland law, "candidates were elected at-large but had to be residents of a specific district with the statewide vote determining winners from each district."

Massachusetts 

Massachusetts required a majority vote, necessitating additional votes if no one won a majority. This was necessary in 4 of the districts.

In the fourth district, 

In the fifth district, 

In the eighth district,

New Hampshire 

New Hampshire law required a winning candidate to receive votes from a majority of voters (16.7% of votes). No candidate won such a majority on the first ballot, so a second ballot was held February 2, 1789.

New Jersey 

The election of all four representatives was contested, but the records that explained the precise grounds on which the election was contested have been lost due to the burning of Washington in the War of 1812. It is known to have related to questions of regularity and procedure. All four representatives' elections were ruled valid.

New York 

New York held elections to the 1st Congress on March 3 and 4, 1789. At the time, districts were unnumbered. They are retroactively numbered in this section.

North Carolina 

North Carolina ratified the Constitution late and thus elected representatives to the 1st Congress in 1790.

Pennsylvania 

Pennsylvania held elections to the 1st Congress on November 26, 1788. For this first election (and again in 1792 election for the 3rd Congress), Pennsylvania chose to elect all of its representatives on a single statewide general ticket, an attempt by the pro-Administration-majority legislature to prevent anti-Administration candidates from winning seats.

Rhode Island 

Rhode Island ratified the Constitution late and thus elected representatives to the 1st Congress in 1790.

South Carolina 

Virginia

See also
 1788–89 United States elections
 List of United States House of Representatives elections (1789–1822)
 1788–89 United States Senate elections
 1788–89 United States presidential election
 1st United States Congress

Notes

References

Bibliography

External links
 Office of the Historian (Office of Art & Archives, Office of the Clerk, U.S. House of Representatives)